South Kedah Expressway (Lekas), or Sungai Petani–Kedah Inner Expressway (SPIKE) , is a new expressway under planning in Kedah, Malaysia. "Lekas" stands for "Lebuhraya Kedah Selatan". The South Kedah Expressway is much similar to the North–South Expressway Central Link E6 (Shah Alam–Nilai North) in the Klang Valley. It will act as a bypass from the state of Penang.

List of interchanges

Expressways in Malaysia